Forever in Blue: The Fourth Summer of the Sisterhood (also known as Forever in Blue) is the fourth novel in Ann Brashares's acclaimed "Sisterhood" series. The story concludes the adventures of four girls who share a pair of "magical" pants that fit each one of them perfectly, despite their vastly different shapes and sizes. This is the fourth book in The Sisterhood of the Traveling Pants series and was considered the last until Brashares published a fifth book in 2011. It was released on January 9, 2007. 

The Sisterhood of the Traveling Pants 2, a movie based on the book, was released on August 6, 2008.

Plot summary

Lena
Lena is taking an extra painting class in the summer at RISD and becomes interested in the anonymous painter who comes in late on the first day. She soon discovers that it is Leonardo (Leo), one of the most acclaimed artists at the college, and she is tempted to look at his progress on his painting. She is overcome by his skill level. Leo sees her examining his work and they cultivate a friendship. Leo invites Lena over to his house for dinner, where she meets his mother, a professional artist. His mother suggests that Lena and Leo pose for each other's figure paintings, leaving Lena flustered, although she still agrees. However, due to her extreme shyness and strict upbringing, she is uncomfortable painting Leo in the nude and is unable to draw him the way she wants to. Leo, however, sees extreme beauty in Lena's body, kissing her after their first session. He asks her to pose for another one. Lena's feelings for Leo grow. However, shortly following the session, Kostos appears at her dorm room. He tells her that he divorced his wife after she apparently lied to him about being pregnant with their child. Lena is at first in shock by Kostos's sudden appearance, but later becomes angry and yells at him for coming back and expecting her to be waiting for him after he abandoned her. When she goes to apologize the next day, Kostos has already left. Lena poses for Leo, and after he kisses her, they make love. After, she goes to her apartment and cries, realizing that she never had feelings for Leo the way she had for Kostos. Later, while in Greece, she meets up with Kostos, who admits that he had gone to the U.S. planning to propose to Lena and never thought she might say no. Lena apologizes for her actions at her dorm and cries in his arms, and the two of them agree that they may never fall in love with anyone else. They kiss and part ways, but not before Kostos says one word in Greek to Lena, meaning "someday", which indicates that their relationship may not be over for good.

Tibby
Tibby is staying in NYU over the summer to work and take a script-writing class. Early in the summer, her long-term boyfriend, Brian, visits and tells her that he has successfully transferred to her college and will join her in the fall. Tibby is overjoyed, both with Brian's news and their relationship in general, and her happiness is so extreme that she begins to worry that it will not last. Later that evening, the two drink to celebrate, and they get moderately drunk and make love for the first time. At first, Tibby is content with their actions, but this quickly changes when she has a pregnancy scare. She begins to have doubts about her relationship with Brian, and these persist even after she realizes she is not pregnant; this leads to her breaking up with Brian. However, she begins to second-guess her actions when Brian tells her that he will not be transferring to her school—the realization that Brian truly accepts their break-up shakes her. She becomes even more upset when Effie, Lena's younger sister, meets Tibby to ask her if she would mind it if Effie and Brian dated. Tibby lies and says that she would not be bothered. Later in the summer, Tibby realizes that she allowed her fear over the pregnancy to darken her relationship and her feelings for Brian. She tells him that she is sorry and that she still cares for him, and he returns the sentiment. They soon resume their slightly modified relationship.

Bridget
Bridget is upset to learn that her boyfriend, Eric, has taken a job as a coach at a summer camp in Mexico. She doesn't want to spend the summer at home, wishing to avoid both missing Eric and her family; following her mother's death, both her father and brother became very withdrawn and antisocial. She impulsively signs up to take a trip to Turkey to work on an archaeological dig with some of her classmates. Once in Turkey, Bridget finds that she loves the work, especially painstakingly unearthing a floor in a room discovered by the archaeological team. Equally enthusiastic is Peter, a handsome young professor. They both find themselves equally attracted to each other, and on Peter's thirtieth  birthday, they kiss. Peter reveals that he wants it to turn into something more, but instead, they part ways for the night. The next day, Peter's wife and kids visit and Bridget, seeing his family in person, becomes disgusted with herself. She realizes that she almost ruined what she longs for most: a family. Upon returning home, she attempts to get closer to her father and brother. Eric visits her at her house and her family, while clearly uncomfortable in social situations, tries to get to know him for Bridget's sake. Later that evening, Eric tells Bridget how much he missed her, and she realizes that she missed him as well. Eric stays the night at her house, and they make love . After Eric leaves the next morning, Bridget finds some boxes in the basement filled with carefully organized and preserved mementos of her mother and her younger self. It becomes evident to Bridget that despite her father's coldness, the work he put into the boxes shows that he truly cares about her. She realizes that, despite their limitations, her family does have something to offer her.

Carmen
Carmen, after a year of social transparency at her new college and a self-proclaimed loss of identity, has maintained only one new friendship—Julia, the resident Drama Diva of the freshman year at Williams, and one of the few freshmen widely known in the social standings. Julia is glamorous, sophisticated, exuberant, and popular—the very antithesis of the new Carmen. Julia invites Carmen to work on the sets of the school play and later on convinces Carmen to attend a summer drama program with her. Julia hopes to win a starring role, whereas Carmen just wants to build sets. However, after having been talked into auditioning for a part in one of the plays performed, Carmen outshines all the other camp attendants and lands the coveted role in the largest of the performed plays (that of Perdita in Shakespeare's The Winter's Tale). Julia, meanwhile, gets only a small role in the community play. She grows immensely jealous of Carmen, who begins to make new friends and regain her confidence in herself. Julia's happiness only returns when Carmen begins to struggle with her acting, and Carmen realizes that Julia enjoys Carmen's misery and feelings of unworthiness, as they make Julia feel better by comparison. At the end of the summer, Carmen performs wonderfully in the play and regains her identity, and ends her friendship with Julia.

Summer's End
At the end of the summer, Effie, depressed at the loss of Brian to his original love, runs off to spend a week in Oia, Greece with her grandmother. She impulsively decides to take the Traveling Pants with her in order to get back at Tibby (for getting back together with Brian) and Lena (for always choosing her friends over her sister). She accidentally loses the Pants so she calls Lena, and when the other girls find out, they all travel to Greece to try to find them. It is here that Lena patches things up with Kostos and finds out everything was a mistake. Despite days of searching, the girls do not find the Pants. However, they enjoy spending time together, realizing that they haven't all been together in a year. They went to the ocean and saw a color in the ocean from something, the pants. They also realize that they had begun to rely on the Pants to maintain their connection, rather than trying to maintain it themselves. They vow to always maintain their bond but not to allow it to keep them from moving forward.

Reception
Kirkus Reviews called Forever in Blue "An ode to love and friendship to delight Brashares’s legions of fans, who have spent a good deal of their young lives sharing the Pants along with the sisterhood." while Publishers Weekly found that "Brashares credibly recounts the emotional turmoil surrounding the girls' love, peer and family tribulations." and concludes "The series' legion followers will eagerly follow each gal through her summer of ups and downs and will again be heartened by the teens' rock-solid friendship"  Common Sense Media stated "While the series' start was a good fit for older tweens, this is really better for a more mature reader, who will better understand what the characters are feeling."  Jenny McWha of Girls Can Do Anything magazine was positive, writing "The characters feel like friends: you want to cry when they cry and smile whenever they smile. Ann Brashares’ writing is clever and interesting, making it hard to put down."

References

External links
The Official "Sisterhood" site

2007 American novels
American novels adapted into films
American young adult novels
Delacorte Press books